The 2019–20 season is Atlético de Rafaela's 3rd consecutive season in the second division of Argentine football, Primera B Nacional.

The season generally covers the period from 1 July 2019 to 30 June 2020.

Review

Pre-season
Three departures were confirmed before 25 June, as Mauro Albertengo, Gastón Suso, Matías Quiroga and Nicolás Toloza left for Agropecuario, Platense, Defensores de Belgrano and Defensores Unidos respectively. Numerous loans from the past campaign officially ended on/around 30 June. Atlético de Rafaela confirmed the signings of eight new players on 3 July: Joaquín Quinteros (Mitre), Renso Pérez (Central Córdoba), Júnior Mendieta (Lanús), Ijiel Protti (Villa Dálmine), Franco Racca (Chacarita Juniors), Ignacio Liporace (Brown), Leonardo Acosta (Almagro) and Alan Bonansea (Lanús). Goalkeeper Ramiro Macagno and winger Marco Borgnino departed on loan on 5/8 July, moving to Newell's Old Boys and Nacional. Abel Masuero was signed by Quilmes on 9 July.

On 13/16 July, Rafaela played friendly matches with Unión Santa Fe Reserves and River Plate Reserves, going unbeaten as they gained three victories. They, on 17 July, announced a trio of incomings in Alexis Niz (centre-back), Maximiliano Paredes (right-back - loan) and Nereo Fernández (goalkeeper) from Tigre, Chacarita Juniors and Unión Santa Fe respectively. Marcelo Guzmán headed off to Santamarina on 16 July. Ezequiel Montagna went to Tigre on 17 July. Consecutive draws were played out with Newell's Old Boys on 20 July. Rafaela lost back-to-back to newly-promoted Primera B Nacional team Estudiantes of Río Cuarto; a day after an encounter with Atlético San Jorge was cancelled. Also on 24 July, Reinaldo Alderete departed for Agropecuario.

Facundo Soloa completed a loan move to Guillermo Brown on 25 July. Rafaela failed to gain a victory across two friendlies with Torneo Federal A's Sportivo Belgrano on 27 July. 30 July saw Denis Stracqualursi sign from Aldosivi. On 1 August, Rafaela held a rematch with Estudiantes (RC) - this time in Río Cuarto, where they'd win by three goals to zero. Facundo Britos and Stefano Brundo were revealed as new signings on 12 August.

August
Rafaela travelled to Adrogué on 17 August to face Brown in Primera B Nacional, coming away with a point after Alan Bonansea had given them the lead. Rafaela fell to defeat in game two in the league, as Tigre took away the points from the Estadio Nuevo Monumental on 23 August. Rafaela and Defensores de Belgrano played out a 2–2 tie in Buenos Aires on 31 August, with Lucas Blondel scoring for the second match running.

Squad

Transfers
Domestic transfer windows:3 July 2019 to 24 September 201920 January 2020 to 19 February 2020.

Transfers in

Transfers out

Loans in

Loans out

Friendlies

Pre-season
Atlético de Rafaela had a friendly with Primera División side Newell's Old Boys scheduled on 27 June. Before that, they'd face the reserve teams of Primera División duo Unión Santa Fe and River Plate. Friendlies with Sportivo Belgrano and an as yet unknown opponent, later revealed as Estudiantes (RC), were also scheduled.

Competitions

Primera B Nacional

Results summary

Matches
The fixtures for the 2019–20 league season were announced on 1 August 2019, with a new format of split zones being introduced. Atlético de Rafaela were drawn in Zone B.

Squad statistics

Appearances and goals

Statistics accurate as of 3 September 2019.

Goalscorers

Notes

References

Atlético de Rafaela seasons
Atlético de Rafaela